Per Wimmer (born 1968) is a Danish philanthropist, space advocate, entrepreneur, financier and author.

Education
Per Wimmer graduated in 1987 with concentrations in mathematics and physics section from Slagelse Gymnasium. In 1988, Per Wimmer has a French Baccalaureate with concentrations in philosophy and French literature.

Per Wimmer graduated with a Master of Laws degree from University of London in 1991-1992 and in 1988-1993 he received Bachelor of Arts and Master of Arts degrees in law from University of Copenhagen whilst serving as student member of the Governing Board of the University of Copenhagen Faculty of Law.

Wimmer graduated with a Master of Public Administration degree from Harvard University with concentrations in business, finance and international relations.

Career
Until the end of the Jacques Delors administration in early 1996, Per Wimmer worked in the cabinet of the Vice-President of the European Commission, Mr. Henning Christophersen, in a junior capacity. The VP responsibilities included the Monetary Union and the EU budget.

During 1996-1997 Per Wimmer was an Associate management consultant at McKinsey & Co. with a particular focus in the media sector.

In 1998-2002, prior to founding his London-based corporate advisory firm, he worked in New York City and London for Goldman Sachs leaving the company as Executive Director for Institutional Sales of European Equity products advising on investments to Scandinavian-based financial institutions. In 2002, Wimmer left Goldman Sachs in favor of similar positions at i.a. Collins Stewart and MF Global/Man Securities, the latter of which is part of the world's largest hedge fund Man Group.

Wimmer owns and administers his own international corporate financial advisory firm, Wimmer Financial, which he founded on the 50th anniversary of Sputnik day, October 4, 2007. Wimmer Financial specializes in global corporate finance, shares trading, real estate and natural resources.

Other occupations
On Oct 6, 2008, Per Wimmer participated in the World's first tandem skydive above Mount Everest, the highest point on Earth, with Ralph Mitchell as tandem master.

Wimmer is a founding astronaut with Sir Richard Branson's Virgin Galactic. In 2001 holds a trip to space reservation with Space Adventures. In December 4, 2008 held a ticket to be the first astronaut on board the XCOR Lynx rocketplane (now canceled). He was expecting to be the first Danish citizen to enter space on board SpaceShipTwo, until Andreas Mogensen did it in 2015.

Publications
In September 2011, Per Wimmer published the book "Wall Street", about the bubbles in the financial markets, with anecdotes from his career in the world of global finance. In June 2014 he published his second book "The Green Bubble" in Sweden for the think tank Timbro, which argues there is a green bubble in the renewable energy sector.

References

External links
 
 
 space-forum.org 
 Space.com: Space Travelers Gather in Croatia for Historic Summit

Danish philanthropists
1968 births
Space advocates
College of Europe alumni
Living people
Harvard Kennedy School alumni
Danish businesspeople